Akören is a town and district of Konya Province in the Central Anatolia region of Turkey. According to 2011 census, the population of the district is 7,042 of which 3,296 live in the town of Akören.

References

External links
 Safranbolu Akoren Village 
 District governor's official website 
 District municipality's official website 

Towns in Turkey
Populated places in Konya Province
Districts of Konya Province
Lycaonia